The Ciudad de Vigo Tournament was a roller hockey competition organized by the Comité Européen de Rink-Hockey, living since 1983 until 2008 through 25 editions.

Format
The competition was composed by 4 teams, placed into 2 semi-final games, with the winners going on to play the final and the losers to play the 3rd/4th place playoff. Only the last edition was composed by 8 teams, thus placed into 4 quarter-final games (with the losers playing 2nd to 8th place play-offs).

Finals

 The tournament was not disputed in 1999.

Performances

By team

By country

References

Roller hockey competitions in Spain